Concord Park is a large park in the North of Sheffield, England, between Shiregreen and Wincobank.

The park consists of Concord Park Golf Course, a country park and Woolley Woods, bordered by Ecclesfield Road.

A historic cruck barn lies at the entrance to the park, the last remnant of the Mediaeval hamlet of Oaksfold.

References

External links

Parks in Sheffield